Leonardo Ljubičić (born December 26, 1966) is a Croatian ICCF Grandmaster.

Biography
From 1994 to 2001 Ljubičić participated in various over-the-board chess tournaments with little success. In later years he played only in Croatian team chess championships. In correspondence chess tournaments participated from late 1990s. In 2016, Ljubičić won the 28th World Correspondence Chess Championship (2013–2016).

References

External links
 
 
 Better than an engine: Leonardo Ljubicic (1/2)
 Better than an engine: Leonardo Ljubicic (2/2)
 

1966 births
Living people
World Correspondence Chess Champions
Correspondence chess grandmasters
Croatian chess players